Two ships of the Royal Navy have been named HMS Fleetwood, after the town of Fleetwood.  A third ship was planned as Fleetwood, but was renamed before being launched:

 was a Royalist ship captured by the Parliamentarians in 1655 and renamed Wexford.
HMS Fleetwood was to have been a  minesweeper. She was renamed  in 1918 and was launched later that year.
 was a  sloop launched in 1936 and broken up after 1959.

References
 

Royal Navy ship names